David Cummings (24 September 1948 – 30 April 1985) was a Canadian wrestler. He competed in the men's Greco-Roman 82 kg at the 1976 Summer Olympics. He was killed in an ultra-light aircraft crash.

References

1948 births
1985 deaths
Canadian male sport wrestlers
Olympic wrestlers of Canada
Wrestlers at the 1976 Summer Olympics
Pan American Games competitors for Canada
Wrestlers at the 1975 Pan American Games
Sportspeople from Ottawa
Accidental deaths in Alberta
Victims of aviation accidents or incidents in Canada
Victims of aviation accidents or incidents in 1985